Teflic acid is the chemical compound with the formula . This strong acid is related to orthotelluric acid, . Teflic acid has a slightly distorted octahedral geometry.

Preparation
Teflic acid was accidentally discovered by Engelbrecht and Sladky. Their synthesis did not yield the anticipated telluryl fluoride , but a mixture of volatile telluric compounds, i.e. :
 (25%)

Teflic acid can also be prepared from fluorosulfonic acid and barium tellurate:

It is also the first hydrolysis product of tellurium hexafluoride:

Teflates

The conjugate base of teflic acid is called the teflate anion,  (not to be confused with triflate). Many teflates are known, examples being  and the acid anhydride . Pyrolysis of the boron compound gives the dimer .

The teflate anion is known to resist oxidation. This property has allowed the preparation several highly unusual species such as the hexateflates  (in which M = As, Sb, Bi). Xenon forms the cation .

References

Further reading
R.B. King; Inorganic Chemistry of Main Group Elements, VCH Publishers, New York,1994.

Oxohalides
Tellurium(VI) compounds
Substances discovered in the 1960s